Commonly referred to as Luangpor Thong, Luangpor Thong Abhakaro is a Buddhist monk and teacher of Mahasati Meditation, a meditation method developed by his teacher, Luangpor Teean Jittasubho. The title Luangpor is used in Thailand to express respect for senior Buddhist monks and it means 'venerable father'.

Biography 
Luangpor Thong Abhakaro was born on 14 May 1939 at Mueang Nongbua Lamphu District, Nong Bua Lamphu Province, northeast Thailand. Luangpor Thong's parents were both farmers. His father died when the boy was seven years old. He was raised mostly by his mother.

In 1961, at the age of 22, he was fully ordained as a monk, and received his Buddhist name, Abhakaro. Then Luangpor Thong studied the traditional Dhamma courses for six years.

In 1967, he met Luangpor Teean Jittasubho, the founder of Mahasati meditation. Luangpor Thong asked his teacher for an intensive meditation retreat under his guidance. Luangpor Thong asked permission to remain secluded in a small cottage practicing by himself, without any obligation to go chanting or asking for alms. Luangpor Teean agreed. Since then, this arrangement became a regular practice during Luangpor Teean's meditation retreats. The young disciple practiced this method continuously for thirty days and reached the state of Rupa-Nama (body-mind basic stage).  Luangpor Thong continued practicing without interruption for another nine days, and achieved the state of "birth-extinction"—an understanding of life and death.

In 1985, Luangpor Teean appointed Luangpor Thong abbot of Wat Sanamnai, the most important Mahasati meditation center in Thailand.  In 1989, Luangpor Teean died.  That year, the "Luangpor Teean Jittasubho (Pann Intapew) Foundation" was founded, with Luangpor Thong as its president.

In 1995, Luangpor Thong established the "Mahasati Association of America", a non-profit organization with the mission of teaching Mahasati meditation in the United States.

Teachings 
A form of vipassana or insight meditation, Mahasati meditation uses movement of the body to generate self-awareness and self-realization. Mahasati meditation is practiced throughout Asia and in the United States and is appropriate for anyone regardless of religion or nationality.

References

Further reading 
 Luangpor Thong Abhakaro, Beyond Text, Beyond Scriptures
 _, Mahasati Meditation, Taiwan: Mahasati Meditation of Taiwan, 2009 (Chinese Version)
 Luangpor Teean, To One that Feels. Bangkok: Supa Printing Co, Ltd., 3rd ed 2005, 
 _, Normality, Bangkok: Luangpor Teean Foundation, 2004
 _, Nibbana, Bangkok: Medchai Printing House, 2006 (Thai)
 _, A Manual of Self-Awareness, Bangkok: Luangpor Teean Foundation, 1994
 _, Teacher, teaching, Bangkok: Luangpor Teean Foundation, 1997, 

1939 births
Living people
People from Nong Bua Lamphu province
Thai Forest Tradition monks
Thai Theravada Buddhist monks
Buddhist meditation